Black Foxes is a novel written by Sonya Hartnett and published in 1996. The story revolves around the life of Lord Tyrone Sully, his best friend Auguste Oscar Herringbone, and his much-loathed cousin Silke. in the 19th century, this book is split into three sections, each covering a period of his life, and leaving gaps between each section.

Plot

Section 1 
21-year-old Lord Tyrone Sully inherits his parents' wealth when his father dies in a bull-related accident, and his mother, wishing to join him, suicides. Depressed, he decides to leave with Oscar to buy a horse in Black Chest. Everything starts to go wrong when his uninvited cousin, Silke turns up and Oscar invites her to join them.

On the long road to the horse auction, Oscar and Silke fall for each other, to Tyrone's annoyance. He says nothing and helps both of them for the sake of his friend. He meets Lord Silverdale, a hated childhood friend who he recovers to be a cheat.

Oscar's stable boy, Grundy buys him a horse and they travel back to Tyrone's house, Wylde Hide. On the way back, he finds Silverdale waiting for him in a bar.  Silverdale shoots Tyrone below the heart. Oscar, with quick thinking, draws out his gun and shoots Silverdale straight in the heart. Silverdale dies, while Tyrone lives, fighting for his life. He eventually heals and returns home.

Section 2 
Oscar is married to Silke, with whom Tyrone eventually becomes friends. Tyrone had taken all the blame for shooting Lord Silverdale, and now not welcome anymore.

Holly, a servant girl goes looking for work, and Tyrone recruits her.

Silke, who is sick of England, decides to run away back to Paris to her original home, leaving Oscar with her baby, Ashley. Meanwhile, Tyrone falls in love with Holly. Oscar and his sister Celia decide that Holly is not good enough for Tyrone.  They trick her into believing he betrayed her, and she runs away as well.

Oscar quickly regrets what he has done and sends Grundy to look for her secretly. After a long time, he finds her dead, having died in childbirth.

Section 3 
Oscar is dead for 14 years and Tyrone has never got over it. He is the legal guardian of Ashley, who is now 21. Silke pays another unexpected visit to Wylde Hide with her daughter, Meg.

Cal, who, unknown to Tyrone, is son of Holly, travels with his best friend to see Tyrone. Grundy, tries to keep both of them a secret, but Tyrone soon finds out. Tyrone is pleased to find his long lost son and their adventure comes to an end.

List of Characters
Tyrone - is the main character in the story. He is a rich lord who has his father's legacy and enough money to last him several lifetimes.

Oscar - is Tyrone's best and most loyal friend. In section 2 he is married with Silke, and in section 3, he has died.

Silke - hated by Tyrone by the 1st section, she quickly becomes his friend. She is married to Oscar, but decides to run away to Paris.

Gabrielle - is a female servant to Silke. She goes along with Tyrone and Oscar in the 1st section.

Grundy - Oscar's stable boy.

Lord Silverdale - is Tyrone's childhood grudge. He dies in section 1 when he shoots Tyrone and Oscar kills him in turn.

Celia - is Oscar's sister. She is a married woman with twins and no wedding ring. She convinces Oscar to trick Holly.

Holly - is a servant for Wylde Hide. She runs away when she believe Tyrone betrayed her and dies giving birth at the end of section 2.

Casper - once saved Tyrone's life from some friends of Silverdale. Although noble at first, he becomes deceitful when he tries to make Holly fall in love with him instead.

Ashley - is the son of Oscar. He was raised by Tyrone ever-since 7 when his father dies.

Meg - was raised by Silke in Paris. She is a fine woman and occasionally visits Ashley.

Cal - is the son of Tyrone and Holly. Oscar keeps him a secret and gives money to him.

Romany - is the best friend of Cal. He accompanies him when traveling to the Herringbone Estate

1996 Australian novels
Novels by Sonya Hartnett
Viking Press books